Human Resource is a Dutch electronic music group established in 1990.

History 
The first members of the group were mixer Robert Mahu and keyboardist Johan Van Beek. They were later joined by keyboardists Jasper Drexhage and Guido Pernet (also MC) and finally by rapper and former professional basketball player Larenzo Nash. They came from the Ridderkerk area. In 1991 they released their biggest hit, "Dominator", famous for being remixed by Joey Beltram and including one of the first uses of Hoover sound. A remixed version appeared on The Pitchfork 500. It was allegedly sampled on Lady Gaga's single Bad Romance in 2009 without royalties or permission and lawfully sampled on Rihanna's "Birthday Cake".

In 1992, Van Beek left without being permanently replaced. Soon after rapper Marvin D became a band member but left in 1995. After Drexhage's departure over dissatisfaction with their new hardcore sound he was replaced by Sander Scheurwater. Human Resource disbanded at the end of 1990s.

Guido Pernet formed the band once again, this time with Zenon Zevenbergen, former MC for gabber producer Patrick van Kerckhoven and vocalist of T99, and Maurice Steenbergen of Rotterdam Termination Source. Zevenbergen left soon after the tour in 2005. The same year they introduced the new gabber music festival named Dominator.

Discography

Albums 
1991: Dominating the World (2B Free Records) #60 NETH
1993: Kicking Noise of Rotterdam (2B Free Records)

Singles 
1991: "Dominator" (80 Aum Records) - #6 NETH, #6 BEL, #36 UK
1992: "The Joke" (2B Free Records) #40 NETH
1992: "Me the Power!" (2B Free Records)
1992: "Rave-O-lution" (2B Free Records)
1993: "Beyond the Edge" (2B Free Records)
1994: "Fuck Them" (K.N.O.R. Records)
1996: "Dominator '96" (K.N.O.R. Records)
1996: "In the Hall of the Mountain King" (K.N.O.R. Records)

References

External links 

Dutch electronic music groups
Hardcore techno music groups
Musical groups from South Holland
Musical groups established in 1990
Musical groups disestablished in 1999
Remixers